Strange Times is the fifteenth album by the rock band the Moody Blues, released  in 1999.  The sound features mostly acoustic guitar, slightly processed electric guitar, light organ, flute, and string arrangements, with heavy synthesizer use in the fast-paced opening track, "English Sunset." This was the last Moody Blues album to feature longtime flautist and vocalist Ray Thomas.

This album and the following year's live album Hall of Fame would be the last two Moody Blues albums to contain any reference to the Moody Blues' custom label Threshold Records in their credits.

Track listing
"English Sunset" (Justin Hayward) — 5:05
"Haunted" (Hayward) — 4:31
"Sooner or Later (Walkin' on Air)" (Hayward, John Lodge) — 3:49
"Wherever You Are" (Lodge) — 3:35
"Foolish Love" (Hayward) — 3:56
"Love Don't Come Easy" (Lodge) — 4:33
"All That Is Real Is You" (Hayward) — 3:33
"Strange Times" (Hayward, Lodge) — 4:29
"Words You Say" (Lodge) — 5:31
"My Little Lovely" (Ray Thomas) — 1:45
"Forever Now" (Lodge) — 4:37
"The One" (Hayward, Lodge) — 3:39
"The Swallow" (Hayward) — 4:58
"Nothing Changes" (Graeme Edge) — 3:32

Personnel
 Justin Hayward — vocals, guitar
 John Lodge — vocals, bass guitar, guitar
 Ray Thomas — vocals, flute, tambourine
 Graeme Edge — drums, percussion, vocals

Additional personnel
 Danilo Madonia — keyboards, organ, orchestration

Charts

References 

1999 albums
The Moody Blues albums
Polydor Records albums